Luis Fernando Ostos Cruz (born 9 August 1992) is a Peruvian long-distance runner.

He represented Peru at the 2016 Summer Olympics in Rio de Janeiro, in the men's 10,000 metres.

References

External links
 

1992 births
Living people
Peruvian male long-distance runners
Olympic athletes of Peru
Athletes (track and field) at the 2016 Summer Olympics
Athletes (track and field) at the 2018 South American Games
South American Games bronze medalists for Peru
South American Games medalists in athletics
People from San Martín Region
21st-century Peruvian people